Cheetah is a 1994 Indian Hindi-language action film directed by Harmesh Malhotra starring Mithun Chakraborty, Ashwini Bhave, Shikha Swaroop, Prem Chopra and Raza Murad. The film's theme is based on the 1990 film Hard to Kill and was later remade as Ram Shastra.

Cast
Mithun Chakraborty as Police Inspector Amar
Ashwini Bhave as Doctor Anita Kedarnath
Rakesh Bedi as Lachhoo
Shikha Swaroop as Rajni Kamalnath
Prem Chopra as Jaimal
Gulshan Grover as Police Inspector Sher Singh
Raza Murad as Kedarnath
Puneet Issar as ACP Khurana
Goga Kapoor as DCP Rajeshwar (Amar's Father)
Guddi Maruti
Deep Dhillon as Inspector Gupta
Shammi as Nurse
Jayshri T as an item number
Disco Shanti as an item number
Vikas Anand as Inspector Kamalnath - Rajni's dad
Gurbachan

Soundtrack

References

External links
 

Films scored by Jatin–Lalit
1994 films
1990s Hindi-language films
Mithun's Dream Factory films
Films shot in Ooty
Indian vigilante films
Indian remakes of American films